Mountain Rest is an unincorporated community near the Chattooga River in northwestern Oconee County, South Carolina. The community is on South Carolina Highway 28 adjacent to a lake on Taylor Creek.  The ZIP Code for Mountain Rest is 29664.

The Oconee State Park Historic District and Russell House are listed on the National Register of Historic Places.

References

Unincorporated communities in Oconee County, South Carolina
Unincorporated communities in South Carolina